ENST may refer to:
the former École nationale supérieure des telecommunications, nowadays Télécom Paris
the former École nationale supérieure des télécommunications de Bretagne à Brest, nowadays Télécom Bretagne
the École nationale supérieure de technologie in Algiers
the École Nationale des Services du Trésor in Paris
Sandnessjøen Airport, ICAO ENST, a regional airport in Norway